Martha C. Ruth a Guamanian politician. Ruth is a former Republican senator in the Guam Legislature.

Career 
In November 1986, Ruth won the election and became a Republican senator in the Guam Legislature. Ruth served her first term on January 5, 1987 in the 19th Guam Legislature. In November 1988, as an incumbent, Ruth won the election and continued serving as a senator. Ruth served her second term on January 2, 1989 in the 20th Guam Legislature. In November 1990, as an incumbent, Ruth won the election and continued serving as a senator. Ruth served her third term on January 7, 1991 in the 21st Guam Legislature, until January 4, 1993.

At the federal level, in May 2004, Ruth was appointed by President George W. Bush as a member of the President's Advisory Commission on Asian Americans and Pacific Islanders. Ruth became a commissioner of the White House Initiative on Asian Americans and Pacific Islanders.

Before July 2010, Ruth became a member of Guam Election Commission. Ruth's term expired in January 2015. Ruth and Joe Mesa were succeeded by Jennifer Calvo-Quitugua and Michael Perez.

References

External links 
 WOMEN IN PUBLIC SERVICE at congress.gov
 Gutierrez v. Guam Election Comm'n at casetext.co.

Guamanian Republicans
Guamanian women in politics
Living people
Members of the Legislature of Guam
Year of birth missing (living people)
21st-century American women